KXZM (93.7 FM) is a radio station broadcasting a Regional Mexican format as part of the Radio Lazer brand. It is licensed to Felton, California, United States, and it serves the San Jose area.  The station is owned by Lazer Licenses, LLC.  In the spring of 2012, KXZM expanded its signal by moving its transmitter from near Felton to near San Jose.

KXZM broadcasts some San Francisco Giants games.

References

External links

XZM
Radio stations established in 2012
XZM
Mass media in San Jose, California